Evison Glacier is a small glacier draining from the south end of Molar Massif in the Bowers Mountains of Victoria Land, Antarctica. This glacier was so named by the New Zealand Geological Survey Antarctic Expedition, 1967–68, for F.F. Evison, New Zealand's first professor of geophysics. The glacier lies situated on the Pennell Coast, a portion of Antarctica lying between Cape Williams and Cape Adare.

References 

Glaciers of Pennell Coast